Anopina parasema is a moth of the family Tortricidae. It is found in Guatemala and Mexico.

References

Moths described in 1914
parasema
Moths of Central America